This article contains information about the literary events and publications of 1964.

Events
January 10 – Federico García Lorca's play The House of Bernarda Alba, completed just before his assassination in 1936, receives its first performance in Spain.
January 12 – The Royal Shakespeare Company Experimental Group open a four-week Theatre of Cruelty season at the LAMDA Theatre Club, London.
January 23 – Arthur Miller's play After the Fall opens at the ANTA Washington Square Theatre Off-Broadway in New York City, directed by Elia Kazan and starring Jason Robards and Kazan's wife Barbara Loden. A semi-autobiographical work, it arouses controversy over Miller's portrayal of his late ex-wife Marilyn Monroe.
February 11 – A London retailer, in the case of R. v. Gold, is found guilty under section 3 of the Obscene Publications Act 1959 of stocking a 1963 edition of John Cleland's novel Fanny Hill (Memoirs of a Woman of Pleasure, 1748–1749).
February 28 – The Dutch comic artist and writer Jan Cremer publishes his autobiographical novel I, Jan Cremer, which provokes controversy for  its frank content and style and becomes a bestseller.
April 23 – Shakespeare Birthplace Trust opens the Shakespeare Centre in Stratford-upon-Avon, England, to house its library and research facilities.
April 29 – Peter Weiss's play with music Die Verfolgung und Ermordung Jean Paul Marats dargestellt durch die Schauspielgruppe des Hospizes zu Charenton unter Anleitung des Herrn de Sade (The Persecution and Assassination of Jean-Paul Marat as Performed by the Inmates of the Asylum of Charenton Under the Direction of the Marquis de Sade, known as Marat/Sade) premières at the Schiller Theater in West Berlin. In August it receives its English-language première by the Royal Shakespeare Company in London at the Aldwych Theatre.
May – Michael Moorcock becomes editor of the science fiction magazine New Worlds.
May 5 – W. H. Auden's preface to the anthology The Protestant Mystics describes the supernatural "Vision of Agape" he experienced in June 1933.
May 6 – Joe Orton's black comedy Entertaining Mr Sloane premières at the New Arts Theatre in London with Dudley Sutton in the title rôle.
May 29 – Le Théâtre du Soleil is established as a collective avant-garde stage ensemble by Ariane Mnouchkine, Philippe Léotard and fellow students of L'École Internationale de Théâtre Jacques Lecoq in Paris. It opens with Les Petits Bourgeois (adapted from Maxim Gorky's Мещане), at Théâtre Mouffetard.
June 22 – Henry Miller's Tropic of Cancer is allowed to circulate legally in the United States by the U.S. Supreme Court three decades after its publication in France, after the U.S. Supreme Court, in Grove Press, Inc. v. Gerstein, cites Jacobellis v. Ohio (decided the same day) and overrules state court findings that the book is obscene.
August 11 – Ian Fleming walks to the Royal St George's Golf Club near Sandwich, Kent, for lunch with friends, collapsing shortly afterward with a heart attack. His last recorded words are an apology to the ambulance drivers:"I am sorry to trouble you chaps. I don't know how you get along so fast with the traffic on the roads these days." Fleming dies next day.
September – The Everyman Theatre opens in Liverpool, England.
September 28 – Brian Friel's play Philadelphia, Here I Come! is premièred at the Gaiety Theatre, Dublin.
October 28 – The Wednesday Play is broadcast for the first time on BBC1 television, presenting original one-off contemporary social drama, mostly written for television.

New books

Fiction
Chinua Achebe – Arrow of God
José Agustín – La Tumba
Lloyd Alexander – The Book of Three
 Eric Ambler – A Kind of Anger
Poul Anderson – Time and Stars
Louis Auchincloss – The Rector of Justin
J. G. Ballard – The Terminal Beach
Simone de Beauvoir – A Very Easy Death (Une Mort très douce)
Saul Bellow – Herzog
Thomas Berger – Little Big Man
Leigh Brackett
People of the Talisman
The Secret of Sinharat
Ray Bradbury – The Machineries of Joy
John Braine – The Jealous God
Richard Brautigan – A Confederate General From Big Sur
John Brunner
To Conquer Chaos
The Whole Man
Edgar Rice Burroughs – Tarzan and the Madman
William S. Burroughs – Nova Express
J. Ramsey Campbell – The Inhabitant of the Lake and Less Welcome Tenants
Victor Canning – The Scorpio Letters
John Dickson Carr – Most Secret
Agatha Christie – A Caribbean Mystery
Louis-Ferdinand Céline – London Bridge: Guignol's Band II
A. J. Cronin – A Song of Sixpence
Cecil Day-Lewis – The Sad Variety
Len Deighton – Funeral in Berlin
R. F. Delderfield – Too Few For Drums
August Derleth (editor) – Over the Edge
Michel Droit – Le Retour
Ralph Ellison – Shadow and Act
Ian Fleming – You Only Live Twice
Max Frisch – Gantenbein
Daniel F. Galouye – Simulacron-3 (Counterfeit World)
William Golding – The Spire
Richard Gordon – Nuts in May
L. P. Hartley – The Brickfield
Hartley Howard – Department K
Bohumil Hrabal – Dancing Lessons for the Advanced in Age (Taneční hodiny pro starší a pokročilé)
Carl Jacobi – Portraits in Moonlight
B. S. Johnson – Albert Angelo
Ken Kesey – Sometimes a Great Notion
Richard E. Kim – The Martyred
James Leasor – Passport to Oblivion
Etienne Leroux – Een vir Azazel (One for Azazel, translated as One for the Devil)
Liang Yusheng (梁羽生) – Datang Youxia Zhuan (大唐游俠傳)
Clarice Lispector – The Passion According to G.H. (A paixão segundo G.H.)
H. P. Lovecraft – At the Mountains of Madness and Other Novels
John D. MacDonald
The Deep Blue Good-by
A Purple Place For Dying
The Quick Red Fox
Ngaio Marsh – Dead Water
Gladys Mitchell – Death of a Delft Blue
Iris Murdoch – The Italian Girl
Sterling North – Rascal
Vladimir Nabokov  – The Defense
Ngũgĩ wa Thiong'o (also known as James Ngigi) – Weep Not, Child
Kenzaburō Ōe (大江 健三郎) – A Personal Matter (個人的な体験; Kojinteki na taiken)
Anthony Powell – The Valley of Bones
Mario Puzo – Fortunate Pilgrim
Ellery Queen – And On the Eighth Day
Jean Ray – Saint-Judas-de-la-nuit
Ruth Rendell – From Doon With Death
Karl Ristikivi – Imede saar
Hubert Selby Jr. – Last Exit to Brooklyn
Ryōtarō Shiba (司馬 遼太郎) – Moeyo Ken (燃えよ剣, Burn, O Sword)
Howard Spring – Winds of the Day
Clark Ashton Smith – Tales of Science and Sorcery
Wilbur Smith – When the Lion Feeds
Rex Stout
Trio for Blunt Instruments
A Right to Die
Julian Symons – The End of Solomon Grundy
Leon Uris – Armageddon
Jack Vance
The Houses of Iszm
The Killing Machine
Star King
Gore Vidal – Julian
Irving Wallace – The Man
Raymond Williams – Second Generation
Maia Wojciechowska – Shadow of a Bull

Children and young people
Lloyd Alexander – The Book of Three
Rev. W. Awdry – Mountain Engines (nineteenth in The Railway Series of 42 books by him and his son Christopher Awdry)
Nina Bawden – On the Run (also Three on the Run)
Christianna Brand – Nurse Matilda
Hesba Fay Brinsmead – Pastures of the Blue Crane
Jeff Brown – Flat Stanley
Roald Dahl – Charlie and the Chocolate Factory
Louise Fitzhugh – Harriet the Spy
Ian Fleming – Chitty-Chitty-Bang-Bang: The Magical Car
Rumer Godden – Home is the Sailor
Irene Hunt – Across Five Aprils
Ervin Lázár – A kisfiú meg az oroszlánok (The Little Boy and the Lions)
Rhoda Levine – Harrison Loved His Umbrella
Ruth Manning-Sanders – A Book of Dwarfs
J. P. Martin – Uncle (first in a series of six books)
Jean Merrill – The Pushcart War
Ruth Park – The Muddle-Headed Wombat on Holiday
Bill Peet
Ella
Randy's Dandy Lions
Shel Silverstein – The Giving Tree
Miriam Young – Miss Suzy

Drama
Ama Ata Aidoo – The Dilemma of a Ghost
David Campton – Dead and Alive
Brian Friel – Philadelphia Here I Come!
Girish Karnad – Tughlaq
Robert Lowell – The Old Glory
Arthur Miller
After the Fall
Incident At Vichy
Joe Orton – Entertaining Mr Sloane
Alexander Vampilov – Farewell in June
Peter Weiss – Marat/Sade

Poetry

Joseph Payne Brennan – Nightmare Need
Leonard Cohen – Flowers for Hitler
Mehr Lal Soni Zia Fatehabadi – Husn-e-Ghazal (The Beauty of Ghazal)
Philip Larkin – The Whitsun Weddings
Oodgeroo Noonuccal – We are Going: Poems
Ion Vinea – Ora fântânilor (The Hour of Fountains)
Donald Wandrei – Poems for Midnight
Up The Line To Death: The War Poets 1914-1918 (anthology)

Non-fiction
Nelson Algren – Conversations with Nelson Algren (interviews by H. E. F. Donohue)
Eric Berne – Games People Play
Allan Bloom with Harry V. Jaffa – Shakespeare's Politics
L. Sprague de Camp
Ancient Ruins and Archaeology (with Catherine Crook de Camp)
Elephant
Hilda Ellis Davidson – Gods and Myths of Northern Europe
Aileen Fox – South West England (Ancient peoples and places series)
Dick Gregory – Nigger: An Autobiography
Ernest Hemingway – A Moveable Feast
Michael Holroyd – Hugh Kingsmill: A Critical Biography
John F. Kennedy (posthumous) – A Nation of Immigrants
Martin Luther King Jr. – Why We Can't Wait
Jan Kott – Shakespeare, Our Contemporary
Violette Leduc – La Bâtarde
Mao Zedong – Quotations from Chairman Mao Tse-tung (毛主席语录, Máo Zhǔxí Yǔlù)
Herbert Marcuse – One-Dimensional Man
Marshall McLuhan – Understanding Media: The Extensions of Man
V. S. Naipaul – An Area of Darkness
Sayyid Qutb – Ma'alim fi al-Tariq (معالم في الطريق, Milestones)
Ayn Rand – The Virtue of Selfishness
The Warren Commission – The Warren Report
Evelyn Waugh – A Little Learning

Births
January 26 – Peter Braunstein, American journalist and playwright
February 23 – Joseph O'Neill, Irish-born writer
March 7 – Bret Easton Ellis, American novelist, screenwriter and short-story writer
March 21 – Kaori Ekuni (江國 香織), Japanese novelist
April 9 – Margaret Peterson Haddix, American children's author
June 5 – Rick Riordan, American young-adult author
June 7 – Petr Hruška, Czech poet
June 11 – Dan Chaon, American novelist and short-story writer
June 22 – Dan Brown, American novelist and mystery writer
June 26 – Conor Kostick, Irish historian and children's author
July 3 – Joanne Harris, English novelist
July 7 – Karina Galvez, Ecuadorian poet
July 16 – Anne Provoost, Flemish novelist and essayist
August 22 – Diane Setterfield, British author
September 9 – Aleksandar Hemon, Bosnian novelist and short-story writer
September 19 – Patrick Marber, English comedian, playwright, director, puppeteer, actor and screenwriter
September 25
 Carlos Ruiz Zafón, Spanish novelist (died 2020)
 Gareth Thompson, English children's author
December 12 – J. R. Moehringer, American journalist and ghostwriter
December 26 – Elizabeth Kostova, American author
December 29 – Christine Leunens, American-born Belgian-New Zealand novelist
unknown dates
Ros Barber, English novelist and poet
Ge Fei (格非, real name: Liu Yong, 刘勇), Chinese novelist
Mai Jia (real name: Jiǎng Běnhǔ, 蒋本浒), Chinese novelist
Nell Zink, American novelist

Deaths
January 17 – T. H. White, English novelist (heart condition, born 1906)
February 1 – Sigge Stark (Signe Björnberg), Swedish writer (born 1896)
February 3 – Clarence Irving Lewis, American philosopher (born 1883)
 February 15 – Reginald Garrigou-Lagrange, French theologian (born 1877)
February 25 – Grace Metalious (Marie Grace DeRepentigny), American novelist (cirrhosis of liver, born 1924)
March 1 – Davíð Stefánsson, Icelandic poet (born 1895)
March 17 – Păstorel Teodoreanu, Romanian poet and satirist (lung cancer, born 1894)
March 20 – Brendan Behan, Irish playwright, poet and writer (born 1923)
April 14 – Rachel Carson, American environmentalist (breast cancer, born 1907)
April 18 – Ben Hecht, American screenwriter (born 1894)
April 23 – Karl Polanyi (Károly Polányi), Austro-Hungarian economic historian and social philosopher (born 1886)
May 13 – Hamilton Basso, American novelist and journalist (born 1904)
July 6 – Ion Vinea, Romanian poet, novelist, and journalist (cancer, born 1895)
July 29 – Wanda Wasilewska, Polish Soviet novelist and journalist (heart disease, born 1905)
August 3 – Flannery O'Connor, American essayist and fiction writer (born 1925)
August 5 – Moa Martinson, Swedish author (born 1890)
August 12 – Ian Fleming, English spy thriller writer (heart attack, born 1908)
August 17 – Mihai Ralea, Romanian critic and sociologist of literature (born 1896)
 September 5 – Angel Cruchaga Santa María, Chilean writer (born 1893)
September 6 – San Tiago Dantas, Brazilian journalist (born 1911)
September 14 – Vasily Grossman, Soviet novelist (cancer, born 1905)
September 18 – Seán O'Casey, Irish dramatist and memoirist (born 1880)
October 26 – Agnes Miegel, German author, journalist and poet (born 1879)
c. November – Radu D. Rosetti, Romanian poet and playwright (born 1874)
November 21 – Leah Bodine Drake, American poet, editor and critic (cancer, born 1914)
November 29 – Anne de Vries, Dutch novelist (born 1904)
December 9 – Dame Edith Sitwell, English poet and critic (born 1887)
December 21 – Carl Van Vechten, American writer and photographer (born 1880)

Awards
Nobel Prize for literature – Jean-Paul Sartre (refused)

Canada
See 1964 Governor General's Awards for a complete list of winners and finalists for those awards.

France
Prix Goncourt: Georges Conchon, L'Etat sauvage
Prix Médicis: Monique Wittig, L’Opoponax

United Kingdom
Carnegie Medal for children's literature: Sheena Porter, Nordy Bank
Eric Gregory Award: Robert Nye, Ken Smith, Jean Symons, Ted Walker
James Tait Black Memorial Prize for fiction: Frank Tuohy, The Ice Saints
James Tait Black Memorial Prize for biography: Elizabeth Longford, Victoria R.I.
Queen's Gold Medal for Poetry: R. S. Thomas

United States
American Academy of Arts and Letters Gold Medal for Drama: Lillian Hellman
Hugo Award: Clifford D. Simak, Way Station
Newbery Medal for children's literature: Emily Cheney Neville, It's Like This, Cat
Pulitzer Prize for Drama: no award given
Pulitzer Prize for Fiction: no award given
Pulitzer Prize for Poetry: Louis Simpson: At The End Of The Open Road

Elsewhere
Miles Franklin Award: George Johnston, My Brother Jack
Premio Nadal: Alfredo Martínez Garrido, El miedo y la esperanza
Viareggio Prize: Giuseppe Berto, Il male oscuro

Notes

References

 
Years of the 20th century in literature